Waqullani (Aymara waqulla pitcher, jug, -ni a suffix to indicate ownership, "the one with a jug", Hispanicized spelling Huacullani) is a mountain in the Andes of Peru, about  high. It is situated in the Arequipa Region, Arequipa Province, Yura District, at the border with the Caylloma Province, Yanque District.

References 

Mountains of Peru
Mountains of Arequipa Region